Hugh Cholmondeley (14 May 1773 – 25 November 1815) was an English Anglican priest, most notably Dean of Chester  from 1806 until his death.

Cholmondeley was born in Cheshire and educated at Brasenose College, Oxford.

References

1770 births
19th-century English Anglican priests
Deans of Chester
Alumni of Brasenose College, Oxford
People from Cheshire
1815 deaths